Tim Billings (born January 4, 1957) is an American football coach and former player. He is currently the outside linebackers coach at Southeast Missouri State. He was previously the defensive coordinator and interim head coach at Southern Miss. He was the head coach at Southeast Missouri State from 2000 to 2005 and served as the interim head coach at Southern Miss during the 2020 season.

Coaching career
Billings began his college coaching career as a graduate assistant at Missouri and Oklahoma. Billings was part of the 1985 national championship team with Oklahoma. He also won two I-AA national championships as an assistant at Marshall in 1992 and 1996. After his time as an assistant at Marshall, Billings was hired as head coach at Southeast Missouri State in 2000. He resigned in 2005 after a 25–43 record.

Billings was named defensive coordinator at Southern Miss before the 2018 season. He coached the safeties at Southern Miss from 2016 to 2017.

In January of 2022, Billings joined the staff at Southeast Missouri State as the outside linebackers football.

Head coaching record

College

References

External links
 Southern Miss profile
 Southeast Missouri State profile

1957 births
Living people
American football defensive backs
Marshall Thundering Herd football coaches
Memphis Tigers football coaches
Missouri Tigers football coaches
Oklahoma Sooners football coaches
Southeast Missouri State Redhawks football coaches 
Southeastern Oklahoma State Savage Storm football players
Southern Miss Golden Eagles football coaches
Wake Forest Demon Deacons football coaches
High school football coaches in Oklahoma
High school football coaches in Texas
Sportspeople from Lawton, Oklahoma
Coaches of American football from Oklahoma
Players of American football from Oklahoma